Rolf Aurness was born on February 18, 1952, in Santa Monica, California. He won the 1970 World Surfing Championships held at Johanna in Victoria, Australia, beating Midget Farrelly in the finals.

Surfing career 
When he was nine Aurness suffered a skull fracture after falling from a tree. His father, reported to be an enthusiastic surfer, used surfing to help his son recover. He implemented a strict training regimen of dawn sessions at beaches, long distance swimming and weekend beach trips, including the Hollister Ranch.

Several times a year they visited Hawaii, renting accommodation on Mākaha beach.

Personal life 
Aurness is the son of Gunsmoke actor James Arness and nephew of Mission Impossible actor Peter Graves.

In the decade following his World Surfing Championship win Aurness fell out of surfing as his wife, mother and sister all died. His wife died in 1978 from cancer, his mother Virginia (née Chapman) died in 1976, and his sister Jenny Lee Aurness committed suicide on May 12, 1975.

His adopted brother, Craig,  founded the stock photography agency Westlight and also was a photographer for National Geographic.
 
His father, well known Western and Gunsmoke television show actor James Arness, died on June 3, 2011.

References

External links 
 The Ranch www.surfline.com. Greg Heller, November 2000 
Carroll: Swimming with Marshal Dillon  Orange County Register. December 28, 2010
 
 

Living people
1952 births
American surfers